Stephany Griffith-Jones (born Stepanka Novy Kafka; June 5, 1947) is an economist specialising in international finance and development, with emphasis on reform of the international financial system, specifically in relation to financial regulation, global governance and international capital flows. She is currently member of the Governor Board at the Central Bank of Chile. She has been financial markets director at the Initiative for Policy Dialogue, based at Columbia University in New York and associate fellow at the Overseas Development Institute. Previously she was professorial fellow at the Institute of Development Studies at Sussex University. She has held the position of deputy director of International Finance at the Commonwealth Secretariat and has worked at the United Nations Department of Economic and Social Affairs and in the United Nations Economic Commission for Latin America and the Caribbean. She started her career in 1970 at the Central Bank of Chile. Before joining the Institute of Development Studies, she worked at Barclays Bank International in the UK. She has acted as senior consultant to governments in Eastern Europe and Latin America and to many international agencies, including the World Bank, the Inter-American Development Bank, the European Commission, UNICEF, UNDP and United Nations Conference on Trade and Development. She was also a member of the Warwick Commission on international financial reform. She has published over 20 books and written many scholarly and journalistic articles. Her latest book, edited jointly with José Antonio Ocampo and Joseph Stiglitz, Time for the Visible Hand, Lessons from the 2008 crisis, was published in 2010.

Griffith-Jones was born in Prague and moved to Chile when she was one year old. She attended primary and secondary school in Chile and graduated from the University of Chile. She is the niece of Franz Kafka. She adopted her current surname after marrying British mathematician Robert Griffith-Jones. She has been economic advisor of Chilean president Gabriel Boric.

Contributions to economic analysis and policy
Griffith-Jones has contributed to research and policy suggestions on how to make the domestic and international financial system more stable so it can better serve the needs of inclusive economic development and the real economy. One of her first articles, The Growth of Multinational Banking, the Euro-currency market and their effects on developing countries in the Journal of Development Studies, published in 1980, warned of the risk of excessive international bank lending to developing economies.

Her 1986 book with Osvaldo Sunkel, Debt and Development Crises in Latin America: The End of An Illusion, showed the negative effects of the 1980s Latin American debt crisis on the region's economic development. She was an early advocate of debt relief in Latin America and Sub-saharan Africa.

Writing with Ricardo Ffrench-Davis in the 1990s she contributed to the debate on how Latin America could curb and manage volatile capital flows. She again warned of the risks of costly financial crises if sufficient measures such as capital controls were not implemented.

After several financial crises, mainly in developing countries, she started in the mid-1990s to advocate capital flow regulations in capital source countries as a way to curb excessive and volatile capital flows. She believed this would reduce the risk of major reversals of capital flows and the financial crises that result from them. This is further discussed in her 1998 book Global Capital Flows, should they be regulated?

In the discussion on reform of the international financial architecture she contributed to the analysis of crisis prevention, especially through financial regulation and more effective financial crisis management. For example, she advocated special drawing rights issues by the International Monetary Fund (IMF) as a means to provide official liquidity when private capital flows fall sharply. She also advocated expanded and less conditional IMF lending so countries do not have to unnecessarily adjust their economies, especially in the face of financial crises or other external shocks.

Writing with José Antonio Ocampo since the late 1990s they expanded the concept of counter-cyclical reform of the international financial system to help stabilise capital flows and domestic private lending. The aim was to avoid frequent costly crises, facilitate macro-economic management and to achieve stable and inclusive economic growth in developing countries.

She has worked on practical policy applications of these ideas. She has advocated reform of compensatory financing at the IMF in the face of external shocks to make it larger, speedier and with less conditionality. Similarly she was an early supporter of expanding development banks - nationally, regionally and multilaterally - and their role in counter-cyclical lending. She has also advocated the issue of GDP-linked bonds as a counter-cyclical mechanism to reduce the risk of financial crises. She has long supported the idea of counter-cyclical regulation. These and other practical measures are aimed at reforming the financial system so that it supports stable inclusive economic growth without costly financial crises.

Publications
 Selected books
 2010, Time for a Visible Hand: Lessons from the 2008 World Financial Crisis, edited with José Antonio Ocampo and Joseph Stiglitz, Oxford University Press, 2010
 2007, International Finance and Development, with José Antonio Ocampo and Jan Kregel, Orient Longman, 2007
 2003, From Capital Surges to Drought, Seeking Stability for Emerging Economies, edited with Ricardo Ffrench-Davis, Palgrave, 2003
 2003, International Capital Flows in Calm and Turbulent Times, The Need for New International Architecture, edited with Ricardo Gottschalk and Jacques Cailloux, The University of Michigan Press, 2003
 2001, Managing Capital Surges in Emerging Markets, edited with Manuel Montes and Anwar Nasution, Oxford University Press, 2001
 1999, Private Capital Flows to Africa, with Louis Kasekende and Matthew Martin et al., FONDAD, 1999
 1998, Global Capital Flows, should they be regulated? with preface by Nobel prize winner  James Tobin, Macmillan and St. Martin’s Press, 1998
 1995, Coping With Capital Surges: The Return of Finance to Latin America, edited with Ricardo Ffrench-Davis, Lynne Rienner, 1995
 1994, Financial Sector Reform in Central and Eastern Europe, edited with Z. Drabek, Macmillan, 1994
 1992, Debt, Cross-Conditionality and Banking Regulations, edited with Ennio Rodriguez, Macmillan, 1992
 1986, Debt and Development Crises in Latin America: The End of An Illusion, with Osvaldo Sunkel, Oxford University Press, 1986

 Selected book chapters
 
 2010, “Agenda and Criteria for Financial regulatory Reform” with Jane D’Arista in Griffith-Jones, Ocampo and Stiglitz (eds.), Time for a Visible Hand: Lessons from the 2008 World Financial Crisis, Oxford University Press
 2008, "The Pro-cyclical Impact of Basle II on Emerging Markets and its Political Economy" with Avinash Persaud, in Stiglitz and Ocampo (eds.), Capital market liberalization and Development, Oxford University Press
 2005, “Should capital controls have a place in the future international monetary system?” with Ricardo Gottschalk and John Williamson, in Marc Uzan (ed), The future of the International Monetary System, Elgar
 1991, "International financial markets: a case of market failure" in Christopher Colclough and James Manor (eds.), States or Markets?  Neo-liberalism and the Development Policy Debate, Oxford University Press

 Selected articles in journals
 2003, “How to Prevent the New Basel Capital Accord Harming Developing Countries”, Presented at IMF-World Bank Annual Meetings September 2003 2003, "Basel II and Developing Countries: Diversification and Portfolio Effects" with Miguel Segoviano and Stephen Spratt, ECLAC Review 2000, "Proposals for a Better International Financial System", World Economics, vol. 2, April – June.
 1992, "Conversion of official bilateral debt: opportunities and issues", Proceedings of World Bank Annual Conference on Development Economics 1991, "Creditor countries' banking and fiscal regulations: can changes encourage debt relief?", Journal of Development Studies, 27 (3): April
 1985, "Ways forward from the debt crisis", Oxford Review of Economic Policy'', 2 (1), Winter.

 Selected articles in popular press
 2012, Osborne will score a financial own-goal tomorrow, New Statesman, Dec 2012
 2012, Stimulating Europe, The FT, June 2012
 2012, Historic moment for the IMF, The FT, May 2012
 2012, Why critics are wrong about a financial-transaction tax, with Avinash Persaud, European Voice, March 2012
 2012, Transforming the financial sector from a bad master to a good servant, Left Foot Forward, February 2012
 2010, "The Movers and the Makers", The Broker
 2010, "The reform of financial markets", El Pais (Spanish), June 2010
 2009, "Now let's tax transactions", The Guardian
 2006, "A bond that insures against instability", with Robert J. Shiller, Financial Times, July 2006
 2003, "Encouraging Capital Flows in times of drought", The Banker, July 2003
 2003, "A capital idea that will hurt poorer countries", Financial Times, May 2003
 2001, "Pivotal change at Doha", The Guardian, November 2001

 Video and online sources
 2012, Al Jazeera, July 2012
 2012, Columbia's Griffith-Jones Discusses Libor Scandal, Bloomberg, July 2012
 2012. Insider Trading on a Massive Scale, The Real News Network, July 2012

See also
 List of economists

References

External links
 Homepage of Stephany Griffith-Jones
 Institute for Policy Dialogue bio
 Stephany Griffith-Jones discusses UNCTADs Least Developed Countries Report 2010 – recording on YouTube of the event held in November 2010
 Financial Transaction Tax would have a positive impact on growth and jobs – European Parliament – recording on YouTube, February 2012

1947 births
Living people
American development economists
Financial economists
New Keynesian economists
Alumni of the University of Cambridge
University of Chile alumni
Academics of the University of Sussex
20th-century American writers
21st-century American writers
20th-century  American economists
21st-century  American economists
20th-century American women writers
21st-century American women writers
Columbia University faculty
American women academics